Narender Grewal (born 11 July 1994) is an Indian wushu competitor.  He was born in Satrod khas ,Hisar, Haryana, India. He won a bronze medal in the men's 60-kg sanda at the 2014 Asian Games.He also won a bronze medal in the men's 65-kg sanda at the 2018 Asian Games. He has won bronze medal in world championship 2012. He is one of the best mma athlete in India having 7 win - 1 loss.

References

https://www.instagram.com/narender_grewal/

1994 births
Living people
Indian male mixed martial artists
Mixed martial artists utilizing sanshou
Indian sanshou practitioners
Wushu practitioners at the 2014 Asian Games
Wushu practitioners at the 2018 Asian Games
Asian Games medalists in wushu
Asian Games bronze medalists for India
Martial artists from Haryana
Medalists at the 2014 Asian Games
Medalists at the 2018 Asian Games